Krisztián Kulcsár (born 28 June 1971) is a Hungarian fencer, who has won two Olympic silver medals in the team épée competition. He became world champion in 2007. As of 2013, he is deputy chairman of the Hungarian Fencing Federation. Kulcsár has a university degree in Economics and Law. In his private life, he is married with two daughters and one son.

Kulcsár was elected President of the Hungarian Olympic Committee (MOB) on 2 May 2017, replacing Zsolt Borkai. The general assembly of MOB withdrew confidence from Kulcsár on 30 December 2021. Therefore, Kulcsár resigned from his position with effect from 31 January 2022.

Awards
 Member of the Hungarian team of year: 1998
 National Defence awards, II.class (1998)
 Hungarian Fencer of the Year (1): 2007

Orders and special awards
   Cross of Merit of the Republic of Hungary – Silver Cross (1992)
   Order of Merit of the Republic of Hungary – Knight's Cross (2004)

References

1971 births
Living people
Hungarian male épée fencers
Fencers at the 1992 Summer Olympics
Fencers at the 1996 Summer Olympics
Fencers at the 2004 Summer Olympics
Fencers at the 2008 Summer Olympics
Olympic fencers of Hungary
Olympic silver medalists for Hungary
Olympic medalists in fencing
Martial artists from Budapest
Medalists at the 1992 Summer Olympics
Medalists at the 2004 Summer Olympics
Universiade medalists in fencing
Universiade silver medalists for Hungary
20th-century Hungarian people
21st-century Hungarian people